Mathilda (Til) Brugman (16 September 1888, Amsterdam – 24 July 1958, Gouda) was a Dutch author, poet, translator, and linguist.

Biography
From 1926 to 1936, she lived in The Hague and later in Berlin with the German Dada artist Hannah Höch. In 1935, she published Scheingehacktes: Grotesken mit Zeichnungen von Hannah Höch.

In her apartment in The Hague, the music room was designed by Vilmos Huszár and supplemented with unique furniture of Gerrit Rietveld. A White Chair was designed by Gerrit Rietveld as a special commission for Til Brugman in 1923. Before Dutch Chair Designer Gerrit Rietveld painted the Red and Blue Chair, he made several mono colored ones. In the room a multi-colored end table by Gerrit Rietveld was also included.

Awards
In 1952, she received the Marianne Philips Prize and the Novels Prize (Amsterdam) for her work.

Selected works

 Das vertippte Zebra : Lyrik und Prosa
 Schijngehakt : grotesken en novellen
 Even anders : vier rabbelverzen 
 Lust en gratie 
 5 klankgedichten
 Tot hier toe en nog verder : notities
 Wat de pop wist 
 Spiegel en lachspiegel
 Eenmaal vrienden altijd vrienden 
 De zeebruid : roman
 Kinderhand 
 De vlerken
 Spanningen
 Maras Puppe : eine Puppe erzählt aus ihrem Leben
 Wiben en de katten
 De houten Christus 
 Tijl Nix, de tranendroger 
 Bodem : Marcus van Boven, Gods knaap
 Scheingehacktes (Grotesken mit Zeichnungen von Hannah Höch)
 Den Haag, KB : 68 D 97a / Brief van Mathilda Maria Petronella Brugman (1888–1958), geschreven aan Rina Louisa Marsman-Barendregt (1897–1953) ; Brieven, voornamelijk van letterkundigen aan H. Marsman en/of Rina Louisa Marsman-Barendregt
 Den Haag, KB : 135 B 333 / De kunstenaar ís zijn werk ; Verzameling brieven, foto's, manuscripten e.d. van voornamelijk beeldende kunstenaars, gericht aan en bijeengebracht door Dorothy Mathilda Suermondt (1912–1988) onder meer secretaresse bij de firma Martinus Nijhoff te Den Haag. Achtereenvolgens gehuwd met Josephus Judocus Zacharias ('Jos') Croïn (1894–1949), schilder en Christiaan W. Zeylstra

Some translations by Til Brugman and collaborations with others 
 De schooiertjes van Napels - Karl Bruckner
 De rijkdommen der aarde : over het huishouden der mensheid : economische aardrijkskunde voor iedereen - Juri Semjonow
 De wonderlamp : een kleurig verhaal uit Bagdad - Max Voegeli
 Giovanna - Karl Bruckner 
 Penny : het geheim van de jonk van de vriendelijke oostenwind - Hans Baumann / G.B. van Goor 
 Vevi - Lillegg, Erica / C.P.J. van der Peet
 Noes is niet voor de poes - Adrian, G. / C.P.J. van der Peet
 De wonderlamp : een kleurig verhaal uit Bagdad voor de jeugd  - Max Voegeli
 Paul Klee, 1879-1940 - Will Grohmann
 De mallemolen - Hans Baumann / G.B. van Goor
 Deta en haar dieren : de geschiedenis van een diergaarde-directeur en zijn jonge assistante - Gerti Egg / G.B. van Goor
 De Stijl, 1917-1931 / The Style, 1917-1931 The Dutch contribution to modern art. [Containing essays by Piet Mondriaan, translated by Til Brugman. With a bibliography.] by Hans Ludwig C Jaffé

References

Sources
 Marleen Slob, 'De mensen willen niet rijpen, vandaar' : leven en werk van Til Brugman, 1994.

1888 births
1958 deaths
Dutch women poets
Dutch translators
Dutch women novelists
Dutch LGBT poets
Dutch LGBT novelists
Lesbian novelists
Lesbian poets
Writers from Amsterdam
Linguists from the Netherlands
De Stijl
Dada
Feminist writers
20th-century Dutch novelists
20th-century Dutch poets
20th-century Dutch women writers
20th-century linguists
20th-century Dutch women